Signal Hill is a historic Confederate Army military site in Prince William County, Virginia.  It is from this location, a signal station atop the hill, that Confederate observers in 1861 spotted Union Army troops attempting to cross Sudley Ford.  The Confederate response to this maneuver began the First Battle of Bull Run.

Part of Signal Hill is now part of a public park owned by the city of Manassas Park; the rest is part of a preservation area belonging to a neighborhood association.  The site was listed on the National Register of Historic Places in 1989.

See also
National Register of Historic Places listings in Prince William County, Virginia

References

National Register of Historic Places in Prince William County, Virginia
1861 in Virginia
Virginia in the American Civil War
Manassas Park, Virginia